Samuel Brown House, also known as The Brick, is a historic home located in Franklin Township, Putnam County, Indiana. It was built about 1841, and is a one-story, "L"-plan, Greek Revival style brick dwelling.  Also on the property is a contributing 19th century barn / granary.

It was listed on the National Register of Historic Places in 2006.

References

Houses on the National Register of Historic Places in Indiana
Greek Revival houses in Indiana
Houses completed in 1841
Buildings and structures in Putnam County, Indiana
National Register of Historic Places in Putnam County, Indiana